Sari Qayah is a village in Nazarkahrizi Rural District of Nazarkahrizi District, Hashtrud County, East Azerbaijan province, Iran. At the 2006 National Census, its population was 518 in 97 households. The following census in 2011 counted 531 people in 128 households. The latest census in 2016 showed a population of 500 people in 139 households; it was the largest village in its rural district.

References 

Hashtrud County

Populated places in East Azerbaijan Province

Populated places in Hashtrud County